is a volcanic group of  mainly stratovolcanoes arrayed along a southwest–northeast axis in Hokkaidō, Japan.

The volcanic group lies on the Kurile arc of the Pacific ring of fire, and consists of andesite, basalt, and dacite stratovolcanoes and lava domes. The group gets its name from the highest peak in the group, Mount Tokachi.

The most recent activity is centered on the northwest end.

List of volcanoes

The following table lists the mountains in the volcanic group.

Other peaks include:
 Chuo-Kakokyu cone       
 Ko-Tokachi-Dake stratovolcano       
 Mae-Tokachi-Dake stratovolcano
 Maru-Yama cone 
 Nokogiri-Dake stratovolcano       
 Suribachi-Kakokyu cone       
 Tairaga-Dake stratovolcano

See also
List of volcanoes in Japan

References

External links 
 Tokachidake - Japan Meteorological Agency 
  - Japan Meteorological Agency
 Tokachi Dake Volcano Group - Geological Survey of Japan
 Tokachidake: Global Volcanism Program - Smithsonian Institution

Volcanism of Japan
Volcanoes of Hokkaido
Volcanic groups